The Open Content Alliance (OCA) was a consortium of organizations contributing to a permanent, publicly accessible archive of digitized texts. Its creation was announced in October 2005 by Yahoo!, the Internet Archive, the University of California, the University of Toronto and others. Scanning for the Open Content Alliance was administered by the Internet Archive, which also provided permanent storage and access through its website.

The OCA was, in part, a response to Google Book Search, which was announced in October 2004. OCA's approach to seeking permission from copyright holders differed significantly from that of Google Book Search. OCA digitized copyrighted works only after asking and receiving permission from the copyright holder ("opt-in"). By contrast, Google Book Search digitized copyrighted works unless explicitly told not to do so ("opt-out"), and contends that digitizing for the purposes of indexing is fair use.

Microsoft had a special relationship with the Open Content Alliance until May 2008. Microsoft joined the Open Content Alliance in October 2005 as part of its Live Book Search project. However, in May 2008 Microsoft announced it would be ending the Live Book Search project and no longer funding the scanning of books through the Internet Archive. Microsoft removed any contractual restrictions on the content they had scanned and they relinquished the scanning equipment to their digitization partners and libraries to continue digitization programs. Between about 2006 and 2008 Microsoft sponsored the scanning of over 750,000 books, 300,000 of which are now part of the Internet Archive's on-line collections.

Opposition to Google Book Settlement

Brewster Kahle, a founder of the Open Content Alliance, actively opposed the proposed Google Book Settlement until its defeat in March 2011.

Contributors
The following are contributors to the OCA:

Adobe Systems Incorporated
Boston Library Consortium
Boston Public Library
The Bancroft Library
The British Library
Columbia University Libraries
Emory University Library
European Archive
Getty Research Institute
HP Labs
Indiana University Libraries
Internet Archive
Johns Hopkins University Libraries
McMaster University
Memorial University of Newfoundland
Missouri Botanical Garden
MSN
The National Archives
National Writers Union
Natural History Museum, London
National Library of Australia
O'Reilly Media
Perseus Project
Prelinger Library and Prelinger Archives
Research Libraries Group
Rice University Libraries
San Francisco Public Library
Simon Fraser University Library
Smithsonian Institution Libraries
Universidad Francisco Marroquín, Guatemala
University of Alberta Libraries
University of British Columbia Library
University of California Libraries
University of Chicago
University of Georgia
University of Illinois at Urbana-Champaign
University of North Carolina at Chapel Hill
University of Ottawa
University of Pittsburgh
University of Texas
University of Toronto
University of Virginia Library
Washington University in St. Louis
William and Flora Hewlett Foundation
Xerox Corporation
Yahoo!
York University Library

Biodiversity Heritage Library, a cooperative project of:
American Museum of Natural History
Harvard University Botany Libraries
Harvard University, Ernst Mayr Library of the Museum of Comparative Zoology
Missouri Botanical Garden
Natural History Museum, London
The New York Botanical Garden
Royal Botanic Gardens, Kew
Smithsonian Institution Libraries

See also
Digital library
Google Book Search
Internet Archive
List of digital library projects
Project Gutenberg
Universal library

References

External links
  (official website)
Video from Open Content Alliance Launch, Oct 2005

Online archives
Open content projects
Organizations established in 2005